The Lega Basket Serie A (LBA) Most Valuable Player (MVP) is an annual award of the 1st-tier professional basketball league in Italy, the Lega Basket Serie A (LBA), given since the 1993–94 season, to the league's most valuable player in a given regular season.

Winners

Player nationalities by national team.

See also
Lega Basket Serie A Finals MVP
Lega Basket Serie A awards

Notes

References

MVP
European basketball awards
Basketball most valuable player awards